Gilruth is a Scottish surname. Notable people with the surname include:

Jenny Gilruth, Scottish politician
John A. Gilruth (1871–1937), Australian veterinary scientist and former Administrator of the Northern Territory
May H. Gilruth, (1885–1962), American artist
Robert R. Gilruth (1913–2000), American aviation and space pioneer
George Ritchie Gilruth MD FRSE (d.1921), Scottish surgeon

See also
 Mount Gilruth, mountain of Antarctica